The Toyota KZ is one of Toyota's small passenger diesel engines.

1KZ-T 

The 1KZ-T is a version of the KZ series engine that used a fully mechanical injector pump instead, 4 cylinders, SOHC, 2 valve per cylinder turbo diesel engine. Compression ratio  remains the same at  21.2:1.

Applications:
4Runner KZN130L
  Hilux
 Land Cruiser II KZJ77

1KZ-TE 

Redline is 4400 rpm. Introduced as the replacement of the 2.4 2LTE engine in Toyota's Light Duty Commercial Vehicles in Japan, it was first introduced in the 70-series Prado in May of 1993 followed by the Hiace and Hilux Surf in August of the same year. The 1KZ-TE also adopts the electronically controlled fuel injection, ETCS-i (Electronic throttle control System - intelligent) technology which is similar in basic construction to a modern gasoline injector, although using considerably higher injection pressures, it is an indirect injection engine which gives it a significant efficiency and fuel consumption penalty. It was replaced in most markets with the 1KD-FTV engine which uses common rail direct injection.

Used in KZN130 (Japan market), KZJ71W, KZJ78W, KZN160 and KZN165R (Australian & South African delivered model).

Applications:
Land Cruiser Prado KZJ90, KZJ95, KZJ120L, KZJ120R
Land Cruiser Prado KZJ71W, KZJ73W, KZJ78W.
Hilux Surf KZN130, KZN185
Hilux KZN165
 Toyota HiAce
Granvia

References

KZ
Diesel engines by model

Straight-four engines